Umberto Rispoli (born 31 August 1988 in San Severino Marche, Italy) is a horse racing jockey. He commenced his apprenticeship in 2005 and graduated to the senior ranks in 2010. He was a member of the Hong Kong Jockey Club until December 2019 when he moved his tack to Southern California. As of July 2022, Rispoli has accrued over $21 million in purses and won 297 races.

Early life
Rispoli was born 31 August 1988 in San Severino Marche, Italy, but his family is originally from Napoli. He grew up in Scampia, the infamous neighborhood later to be used as the set for the Gomorrah (TV series).
In the summer of 2002, Rispoli left Naples to reach Luigi Camici's stable, in Cisterna di Latina. Camici saddled the Arc de Triomphe winner Tony Bin in 1988, the same year when Umberto was born.
In Autumn 2004, Umberto got his Jockey Licence in the Italian Racing School in Pisa. On 5 February 2005, he made his debut in Varese for Alduino Botti, who later became his trainer for five years. He rode 82 winners on his first year as apprentice.
In 2009, Rispoli was crowned Champion Jockey for the first time, a feat he repeated in 2010.
He spent five seasons in France between 2012 and 2016, before moving to Hong Kong, and then in 2019 to Los Angeles, California, where he lives with his wife Kimberley Mosse and their son Hayden.

Career as a jockey
Rispoli rode his first race in Varese on Polar Eagle in February 2005. He finished second.
On 19/2/05 he rode his first winner, Pace Maker.
He was crowned Champion Italian Jockey during the 2009 and 2010 racing seasons.
In 2009 Rispoli broke the Italian record of Gianfranco Dettori's 229 winners exactly 20 years later on the very same day 21/11/09. Rispoli did 230 on Sugarland in Pisa, eventually setting the  new record at 245.
After 5 season 2012–2016 in France with few Gr1 success in the bag, he moved to Hong Kong he rode under HKJC. In December 2019, he moved to Southern California where he has made quite an impact in the local jockey colony. 
He rode so far 1492 winners around the world, including Italy, France, England, Germany, Czech Republic, Japan, Hong Kong, South Africa and Mauritius.

Major wins

Twice Italian Champion Jockey: 2009 and 2010

 Italy

Premio Lydia Tesio (Group 1) – Aoife Alainn (2010)
Premio Presidente della Repubblica (Group 1) – Estejo  (2011)
Premio Gran Criterium (Group 1) – Priore Philip  (2013)
Premio Presidente della Repubblica (Group 1) – Cleo Fan  (2015)

 Japan
Takamatsunomiya Kinen (Group 1) – Kinshasa no kiseki (2011)

 Hong Kong
Queen Elizabeth II Cup (Group 1) – Rulership  (2012)

 France
Prix du Cadran (Group 1) – Molly Malone  (2012)
Critérium International (Group 1) – Vert de Grece  (2014)

United States
Santa Anita Derby (Group 1) - Rock Your World (2021)
Shoemaker Mile Stakes (Group 1) - Smooth Like Strait (2021)
Rodeo Drive Stakes (Group 1) - Going to Vegas (2021, 2022)
Gamely Stakes (Group 1) - Ocean Road (2022)

Year-end charts

References

The Hong Kong Jockey Club

Italian jockeys
Living people
1988 births
American jockeys